Nobuko, Lady Albery (born 1940) is a Japanese author and theatrical producer and the widow of English theatrical impresario, Sir Donald Albery.

Early life

She was born Nobuko Uenishi in Kobe, Japan, the daughter of parents Keiji and Sodako. She attended Waseda University and later New York University from 1961 to 1963 where she received her Masters in drama.

International flavour
Through her theatre work she helped to bring several adaptations of Western plays to Japan, beginning in 1963 with Gone with the Wind. Other plays include: Fiddler on the Roof (1964), Les Misérables (1987), Oscar (1994), as well translator into Japanese of Oliver! (1968) and Miss Saigon (1992).

Despite being a native of Japan, she has lived abroad most of her life and considers herself an outsider to Japan. This enabled her to bring a different perspective to theatre in Japan by challenging how plays are produced there and what Japanese audiences will respond to.

Personal life
Her first husband was author Ivan Morris  (son of author Ira Victor Morris, grandson of diplomat Ira Nelson Morris, and great-grandson of meat-packer Nelson Morris). She later married Sir Donald Albery.

Bibliography 

Samurai (1969 - under the name Nobuko Morris, co-authored with Ivan Morris and Paul Varley)
Balloon Top (1978)
The House of Kanze (1985)
Absurd Courage (1987)
Japanese Pride and Prejudice (2002)

References

Sources
 Michael Church, The Times, 28 September 1994,  "Just a Girl Who Can't Say Noh", p. 32

Living people
1940 births
Japanese theatre managers and producers
Morris family (meatpacking)
Japanese expatriates in the United States
New York University alumni
Wives of knights